Short-track speed skating at the 2017 Asian Winter Games was held in Sapporo, Japan between 20–22 February at the Makomanai Ice Arena. A total of eight events were contested (four each for men and women).

Schedule

Medalists

Men

Women

Medal table

Participating nations
A total of 93 athletes from 17 nations competed in short-track speed skating at the 2017 Asian Winter Games:

 
 
 
 
 
 
 
 
 
 
 
 
 
 
 
 
 

* Australia and New Zealand as guest nations, were ineligible to win any medals.

References

External links
Official website
Official Results Book – Short Track Speed Skating

 
2017 Asian Winter Games events
2017
2017 in short track speed skating